Perry Lim Cheng Yeow  is a Singaporean former lieutenant-general who served as Chief of Defence Force between 2015 and 2018.

Education
Lim studied at Raffles Institution and won the President's Scholarship and the Singapore Armed Forces Overseas Scholarship in 1991. He studied at Christ's College, Cambridge, where he received a starred first in mechanical engineering. In 2008, he won the Lee Kuan Yew Postgraduate Scholarship and went on to study for a Master of Business Administration at INSEAD's Singapore campus.

Military career
Lim enlisted in the SAF in December 1990 and was commissioned as a Guards officer in August 1991. He served as the Commanding Officer (CO) of the 1st Battalion Singapore Guards from 2003–2005, the Commander of the 7th Singapore Infantry Brigade in 2009, the Commander of the 3rd Division from 2011–2013, and the Chief of Staff (General Staff) from 2013–2014. Before he became the Chief of Staff (General Staff), he held the following appointments in the Ministry of Defence (MINDEF): Head, Joint Plans and Transformation; Branch Head, Defence Policy Office, Joint Operations Department; Deputy Assistant Chief of the General Staff (Operations). He was also the chairman of the executive committee of Singapore's National Day Parade in 2013.

Lim completed the Combined Arms Tactics Course conducted by the British Army in Warminster in 1998. He also attended the United States Army Command and General Staff College in Fort Leavenworth between 2001 and 2002. He was promoted to the rank of Brigadier-General on 1 July 2011.

Lim succeeded Ravinder Singh as the Chief of Army on 21 March 2014. He was succeeded by Melvyn Ong as the Chief of Army on 14 August 2015 and replaced Ng Chee Meng as the Chief of Defence Force (CDF) on 18 August 2015.

Lim was promoted to the rank of Lieutenant General on 1 July 2016.

Non-military career
In addition to his military appointments, Lim was also a member of the Singapore Administrative Service.

From 2006 to 2008, he briefly retired from active military service and served as the Director of Higher Education in the Ministry of Education, where he was in charge of policies, planning and funding for tertiary and technical education, and regulating private education.

Lim joined resource manufacturer Royal Golden Eagle as a managing director in January 2019.

Personal life
Lim is married with three children.

Awards and decorations
  Meritorious Service Medal (Military) - PJG
  Public Administration Medal, (Gold) (Military) - PPA(E)
  Public Administration Medal, (Silver) (Military) - PPA(P)
  Long Service Medal (Military)
  Singapore Armed Forces Long Service and Good Conduct (20 Years) Medal
  Singapore Armed Forces Long Service and Good Conduct (10 Years) Medal with 15 year clasp
  Singapore Armed Forces Good Service Medal
  The Most Exalted Order of Paduka Keberanian Laila Terbilang (1st Class)
 Grand Meritorious Military Order Star (1 Class), Indonesia
  Army Meritorius Service Star (1 Class), Indonesia
  Knight Grand Cross of the Most Noble Order of the Crown, Thailand
  Darjah Panglima Gagah Angkatan Tentera ( Honorary Malaysian Armed Forces Order for Valour (First Degree) )
  US Legion Of Merit (Commander)
  Basic Parachutist Badge
  Basic Diving Badge
  Combat Skills Badge (CSB)
  Guards Tab
  Thailand Master Airborne Badge

References

Living people
Raffles Institution alumni
Raffles Junior College alumni
Alumni of Christ's College, Cambridge
INSEAD alumni
Singaporean people of Chinese descent
Chiefs of Defence Force (Singapore)
Chiefs of the Singapore Army
President's Scholars
Recipients of the Long Service Medal (Military) (Singapore)
1972 births